The Prix Iris for Best Sound in a Documentary is an annual film award, presented by Québec Cinéma as part of its Prix Iris awards program, to honour the year's best film sound in documentary films made within the Cinema of Quebec.

The award was presented for the first time at the 20th Quebec Cinema Awards in 2018.

2010s

2020s

References

Awards established in 2018
Sound in a Documentary
Film sound awards
Canadian documentary film awards
Quebec-related lists